Huaypun (possibly from Quechua waypu a name applied for different species of Tinamidae, Nothoprocta pentlandii, Rhynchotus rufescens and Rhynchotus maculicollis, -n a suffix) is a mountain in the Cusco Region in Peru, about  high. It is situated in the Calca Province, San Salvador District, and in the Quispicanchi Province, Oropesa District. Huaypun lies on the western bank of the Vilcanota River, southeast of Pachatusan and southwest of  Tauja.

See also 
 Pumacancha
 Curi

References 

Mountains of Peru
Mountains of Cusco Region